Frank Opoku Acheampong (born 16 October 1993) is a Ghanaian professional footballer who plays as a forward for Chinese Super League club Shenzhen and the Ghana national team.

Youth career
He started his career with Ghanaian side King Faisal Babes, under the direction of Romain Krider, his first coach. He was invited for trials by Sheikh Mansour, who owns the English side Manchester City, to his base in Abu Dhabi, to be observed by Al-Jazeera, the other club he owns. He also has a child name James Halto In 2010, he was on trial for Croatian club NK Osijek but he couldn't obtain a work permit.

Club career

Buriram United
In February 2011, he joined Thai League T1 side Buriram United. After his impressive performance in Thai League T1, Acheampong was invited for a trial with Scottish club Celtic in December 2012. In January 2013 Acheampong moved to Belgian club R.S.C. Anderlecht on a loan spell until the end of the 2012–2013 season.

R.S.C. Anderlecht
On 16 April 2013, Acheampong signed for the Belgian champions R.S.C. Anderlecht for a fee of €1 million. On 28 July, Acheampong made his first appearance for Anderlecht against KSC Lokeren; he came on in the 70th minute in a 2–3 loss. In the 4–1 win over KAA Gent, he came on in the 69th minute and scored his first goal in Belgium. On 17 September Acheampong made his first UEFA Champions League appearance against Benfica; he came on as a substitute in the 46th minute; it ended as a victory for Benfica.

Tianjin Teda
On 13 July 2017, Anderlecht announced that Acheampong had joined Chinese Super League side Tianjin TEDA on a six-month loan deal. He made his debut on 22 July 2017. He scored four goals in 12 appearances in the 2017 season which secured Tianjin Teda's stay in the top flight for the next season. On 8 November 2017, Tianjin Teda exercised the option to permanently sign Acheampong.

Shenzhen FC
On 12 April 2021, Shenzhen FC announced that Acheampong had joined Shenzhen FC.

International career
In August 2012, Acheampong was called up to Ghana national team for the international friendly match against China PR in Xi'an. He made his debut in the starting lineup while Ghana drew 1–1 with China on 15 August.

On 23 September 2012, he was made the captain of the Ghana U-20's. In a match against Morocco U-20 in 2013 African Youth Championship qualification, he scored twice as the Ghana U-20's won the match 4–1.

On 10 September 2013, Acheampong scored his first international goal for Ghana against Japan in a friendly match.

Career statistics

Club statistics

International goals
 (Ghana score listed first, score column indicates score after each Acheampong goal)

Honours
Buriram PEA
 Thai Premier League: 2011
 Thai FA Cup: 2011, 2012
 Thai League Cup: 2011, 2012

RSC Anderlecht
 Belgian Pro League: 2013–14, 2016–17
 Belgian Super Cup: 2013, 2014
Ghana U-20
 FIFA U-20 World Cup third Place: 2013

Ghana
Africa Cup of Nations runner-up:2015

References

External links

Frank Acheampong profile at R.S.C. Anderlecht website
Best Football Cleats  at imscouting.com

1993 births
Living people
Ghanaian footballers
Association football wingers
Frank Acheampong
R.S.C. Anderlecht players
Tianjin Jinmen Tiger F.C. players
Frank Acheampong
Belgian Pro League players
Chinese Super League players
Ghanaian expatriate footballers
Ghanaian expatriate sportspeople in Thailand
Ghanaian expatriate sportspeople in Belgium
Ghanaian expatriate sportspeople in China
Expatriate footballers in Thailand
Expatriate footballers in Belgium
Expatriate footballers in China
Ghana under-20 international footballers
Ghana international footballers
2015 Africa Cup of Nations players
2017 Africa Cup of Nations players
20th-century Ghanaian people
21st-century Ghanaian people